The following articles contain lists of prohibited books:

 Index Librorum Prohibitorum
 List of authors and works on the Index Librorum Prohibitorum
 List of books banned by governments
 Book censorship in Canada
 Book censorship in China
 List of books banned in India
 Book censorship in Iran
 List of authors banned in Nazi Germany
 List of books banned in New Zealand
 Book censorship in the Republic of Ireland
 Book censorship in the United States

See also
 Lists of banned books